Konstantinos Dogras (Greek: Κωνσταντίνος Ντόγρας) was a Greek chieftain of the Macedonian Struggle from Vogatsiko, Kastoria.

Biography 
Konstantinos Dogras was born in the end of the 19th century in Vogatsiko. He studied in the primary school of Vogatsiko, where Athanasios Iatrou from Polygyros taught. He formed an armed group to counter Bulgarian attacks and operated in the areas of Popoli and Verno. He was one of the closest partners of Pavlos Melas.

Sources 
 Athanasios Iatrou, The action of the chieftain Kostas Dogras from Vogatsiko, Macedonian Struggle, v. 14 (1930), pp. 14-15
 Ioannis S. Koliopoulos (scientific editing), Obscure, native Macedonian fighters, Society for Macedonian Studies, University Studio Press, Thessaloniki, 2008, p. 74

Greek people of the Macedonian Struggle
Commons category link is on Wikidata
People from Kastoria (regional unit)